The Ministry of Economy and Sustainable Development of the Republic of Croatia is the ministry in the Government of Croatia which is in charge of the development of the economy, and conducting administrative and other tasks related to:
industry, except food and tobacco industry, shipbuilding, energy, mining, trade, cooperatives, other than agricultural, small and medium businesses, trade, trade policy, and policy to protect domestic production; economic cooperation with foreign countries,
involvement in European economic integration, the harmonization of activities in conjunction with the Croatian membership in the World Trade Organization and participation in multilateral trade negotiations in the framework of this organization,
promotion of exports and foreign investment, the establishment and operation of free zones, systematic stimulation of entrepreneurship, state of market, supplies and prices, consumer protection, strategic stockpiles, the privatization of shares and stakes in the state owned companies, restructuring and rehabilitation of legal entities,
safety at work.

List of ministers

Ministers of Crafts, Small and Mid-sized Entrepreneurship (2000–2003)

Ministers of Entrepreneurship and Crafts (2011–2016)

Origins

The Ministry of Economy was not included as such in the first four Croatian Governments. The Cabinet of Stjepan Mesić and the Cabinet of Josip Manolić included the minister for social planning (post held by Stjepan Zdunić) and the minister of energy and industry (Božo Udovičić). In the Cabinet of Franjo Gregurić, the former minister became the minister of economic development, and there was also a minister of trade (Petar Kriste, Branko Mikša). The Cabinet of Hrvoje Šarinić in turn included the minister of industry, shipbuilding and energy (Franjo Kajfež) and the minister of tourism and trade (Branko Mikša).

In the Cabinet of Zlatko Mateša, the prime minister also talked of renaming the ministry of economy back into the ministry of industry and energy. In the Cabinet of Andrej Plenković in October 2016 the Ministry of Economy was merged with the Ministry of Entrepreneurship and Crafts into the Ministry of Economy, Small and Medium Entrepreneurship and Crafts.

References

External links
 

Economy
Croatia
Croatia
Labor in Croatia